John Cooper Works (JCW) is an English car brand now owned by BMW and used on its Mini vehicles. It was founded in 2002 by Michael Cooper, son of John Cooper, the racing car maker and tuner responsible for the original Mini Cooper.

In 2007, German automaker BMW acquired the rights to the name, and it bought out the company in 2008.

JCW Tuning

Cooper

The first ever JCW kit was a  upgrade for the Mini Cooper. The kit consisted of the following components:

Flowed and ported cylinder head
Air filter
Cover injection tube
Uprated exhaust (from the catalytic converter back)
Remapped ECU
Decorative emblems

The main advantage was that these improvements, though fairly minor, could be made to the Cooper without jeopardizing the factory warranty. In 2004, JCW discontinued the Cooper kit and introduced a Sound Kit for the Cooper. The Sound Kit consisted of a unique air intake system, cat-back exhaust and an ECU remap.

Cooper S R52 and R53

Released in 2003, the kit consisted of the following components:

 Uprated cylinder head, gas-flowed and ported
 11% Reduction of the supercharger pulley size, making the same supercharger spin faster for a particular engine speed 
 1-step colder, Colder Temperature Range spark plugs
 Uprated exhaust system (maintaining the same header and catalytic converter) 
 Remapped ECU
 Decorative badges, individually numbered engine plate and certificate signed by Mike Cooper

At the time, the kit could not be factory-ordered, but had to be retrofitted at a Mini dealers or from John Cooper Works themself based in West Sussex , but from late 2005 the Cooper S could be ordered with the upgrade straight from BMWs factory.

 Uprated injectors (380cc/min instead of 330 cc/min)
 Remapped ECU for the injectors
 Uprated air intake system and air filter with vacuum controlled flap
 200 & 210 versions came with 2 A4 sized certificates one for installation and the other for authenticity as now in 2022 provenance is very important

A "JCW Sound Kit" (Cooper) was made available at the same time, consisting of the cat-back exhaust and the air filter, giving a sportier exhaust note and a  power increase for around €1100.

Cooper S R55, R56 and R57

In 2007, Mini released the JCW tuning kit for the new "R56" version of the car. The torque figure climbs 10 Nm to 250 Nm (270 Nm with overboost). Acceleration from 0–100 km/h (0-62 mph) is now 6.8 seconds, and a top speed of 232 km/h (144 mph) is now possible. This kit is commonly referred to as the "Stage 1 Kit", although this nomenclature has never been officially employed by JCW or by BMW.

According to Mike Cooper, this kit would create "the fastest Mini ever produced" above all due to the extra torque and in-gear acceleration, which in certain driving situations will be even faster than the  Mini JCW GP.

In 2011, the JCW tuning kit was updated for the Cooper S LCI (135 kW). The kit consists of an uprated exhaust (cat-back), intake system, exhaust manifold and an ECU remap. The tuning kit includes a small plaque with a unique serial number mounted on the engine, as well as front and rear JCW emblems. The power is increased 12 kW from the standard 135 kW to 147 kW.

Factory John Cooper Works R56

In mid-2008, Mini brought out a new addition to the JCW family - the Mini John Cooper Works. This is in fact not another power kit, but a whole new version of the R56 Mini Hatch, model code MF91 (MM91 in the Clubman version). This new version comes with major differences from the factory, compared to the  power kit that can be supplied through the dealer network:

Maximum power of 155 kW (208 bhp) at 6000 rpm, and 260 Nm of torque (280 with overboost). This is achieved by means of a new, uprated turbocharger, larger-bore exhaust and a sportier ECU map. 0–100 km/h time is down to 6.3 seconds (6.6 in the case of the Clubman). Fuel consumption and emissions are also up, however, compared to the  kit which has no change compared to the standard  Cooper S.
Electronic limited slip differential (EDLC - Electronic Differential Lock Control). This is infinitely variable between 0% and 50%, as opposed to the permanent 30% of the optional LSD fitted to the R56 MINI Cooper S.
DTC (Dynamic Traction Control) as fitted as standard on all current BMW models. The John Cooper Works is the first variant of the Mini to come with DTC which, to date, is not available even as an option on other variants. The main difference between DTC and the existent DSC is the ability to "remap" the parameters for the traction and stability control systems, to allow a sportier drive while still employing these systems at the last minute, without fully deactivating them.
Brembo 4 pot caliper JCW brakes, consisting of: four-piston aluminium fixed front brake calipers finished in red with John Cooper Works logo, red painted single piston rear calipers, perforated and grooved ventilated front brake discs (316x22mm or 12.44x0.87in), rear brake discs (280x10mm or 11x0.39in)

2013 Factory John Cooper Works GP

Commonly referred to as the GP2, the 2013 John Cooper Works GP is a limited-edition, track-oriented version of the regular John Cooper Works hatchback based loosely on the JCW Challenge race car.  Production was limited to 2000 units worldwide.  The GP2 boasts a 218-hp (214 for US models) turbo-charged 1.6 L direct-injected four cylinder engine, giving it a 0–60 mph time of 6.1 seconds and a top speed of 150 mph.  The engine is essentially identical to the N18 used in other 2013 John Cooper Works models, with a slight increase in compression accounting for the modest power gain.  In keeping with its uncompromising roots, a 6-speed manual gearbox was the only transmission offered.   The GP2 also features exclusive 17” wheels, high-performance tires designed in a special partnership with Kumho, adjustable coil over suspension with revised geometry unique to the GP, 6-piston Brembo® front calipers borrowed from the BMW 135i, a full valance tray and functional rear diffuser, a hatch-mounted spoiler with carbon fiber element, red mirror caps, brake ducts, signature badging, a pair of special-edition RECARO sport seats (complete with side-impact airbags), and deletion of the rear seats to save weight.  The stability control suite features an additional "GP mode" exclusive to this model which permits a greater degree of wheel-slip while retaining function of the brake-based electronic limited slip differential.  The 500 examples sold in the US originally retailed for $39,950 and were available in only one configuration.

Notable racing history:
MINI has confirmed it lapped the Nürburgring-Nordschleife track in 8 minutes and 23 seconds - an improvement over the previous GP model by 19 seconds.
John Hume Sr won the 2014 Targa Newfoundland Grand Touring division in a GP2, and again in 2017.

2015 Factory John Cooper Works
MotorPress.ca reviewed the F56 JCW and gave it a rating of 8.3 out of 10, praising its driving characteristics and mighty engine. The JCW is a powerhouse.

Countryman

The John Cooper Works Countryman is the first 5-door JCW from Mini that unveiled at the 2012 Geneva Motor Show. The North American debut of the Countryman JCW was unveiled at the 2012 New York Auto Show.

References

English brands
BMW
Car brands
 
2002 establishments in England